Labour Party is a political party in Thailand.

History

Labour Party (1968-1971) 
The Labour Party was founded on December 23, 1968 by Kan Chueakeaw as leader and Weera Thanomkiang as secretary-general. On February 10, 1969 the Labour Party lost in election.

Labour Party (1974-1976) 
The Labour Party was founded on November 21, 1974. by Seri Suchatapakan as leader and Sa-ard Piyawan as secretary-general. The party won 1 seat in the April 4, 1976 election.

General election results

References 

Defunct political parties in Thailand
1968 establishments in Thailand
Political parties established in 1968